Centre for Research of Orthodox Monarchism is a Serbian monarchist association from Belgrade, founded in 2001 and registered with the Ministry of Justice of Federal Republic of Yugoslavia in May 2002.

Its founder and first director was Nebojsha M. Krstich, also known as the founder of the Fatherland movement Obraz. Nebojsha died in an alleged car accident, on 4 December 2001. He was succeeded as the director of the Centre by Rev. Deacon Nenad M. Jovanovich, of the Serbian Orthodox Church. From 2008 until 2012 the director was Rev. Presbyter Boshko R. Marinkov, and since 2012 the director is Very Rev. Presbyter Nemanja S. Mrdjenovich.

Centre has five study committees and two volunteer sections. The five study committees are the Board for heraldry and genealogical studies, The Board for Cultural studies, the Board for Historiography, the Board for State and Legal studies, and the Board for Theological studies. Two volunteer sections are The Serbian Orthodox Action 'Sabor' and 'Society for fighting addiction diseases 'Svitanje' (Eng. 'dawn').

The Centre operates under the High Patronage of Prince Alexander (Paul's) Karageorgevich and Spiritual Patronage of Irinej (Dobrijevich) Bishop of the Metropolitanate of Australia and New Zealand of the Serbian Orthodox Church.

During their 'patron saint' celebration in June 2013, held at the Orthodox Theological Faculty of University of Belgrade, with the blessings of Serbian Patriarch Irinej, they received support from highest ranking representatives of the Serbian Orthodox Church, Serbian Army, and Crown Prince Alexander II Karageorgevich. In June 2014 the Centre received a St. Emperor Constantine medal, awarded by the Holy Synod of the Serbian Orthodox Church.

Centre is considered to be one of the highest authorities in Balkan heraldry. They have published books, including poetry and translations of monarchist books into Serbian. Their representatives participated in a number of international academic conferences. The official web site of CROM contains the largest collection of works on Orthodox monarchism in Serbian language.

2001 establishments in Serbia
Organizations based in Belgrade
Monarchism in Serbia
Monarchist organizations
Eastern Orthodoxy and politics